Roderick R. McKelvie (born 1946) is a former United States district judge of the United States District Court for the District of Delaware.

Education and career
Born in Maldon, England, McKelvie received a Bachelor of Arts degree from Harvard University in 1968 and a Juris Doctor from the University of Pennsylvania Law School in 1973. He was a law clerk for Judge Caleb Rodney Layton III of the United States District Court for the District of Delaware from 1973 to 1974. He was in private practice in Wilmington, Delaware from 1974 to 1992.

Federal judicial service
On November 5, 1991, McKelvie was nominated by President George H. W. Bush to a seat on the United States District Court for the District of Delaware vacated by Judge Murray Merle Schwartz. McKelvie was confirmed by the United States Senate on February 27, 1992, and received his commission on March 2, 1992. McKelvie served in that capacity for a decade, during which time over 200 patent infringement cases were filed in his court, of which over 30 went to trial. He resigned from the bench on June 28, 2002. He thereafter returned to private practice with the firm of Covington & Burling in Washington, D.C., but has since retired.

References

Sources
FJC Bio

1946 births
Living people
Judges of the United States District Court for the District of Delaware
United States district court judges appointed by George H. W. Bush
20th-century American judges
University of Pennsylvania Law School alumni
Harvard University alumni
People associated with Covington & Burling